Operation Swallow: The Battle for Heavy Water (original title: Kampen om tungtvannet, French title: La Bataille de l'eau lourde) is a Norwegian-French film from 1948. The history is based on the best known commando raid in Norway during World War II, where the resistance group Norwegian Independent Company 1 destroyed the heavy water plant at Vemork in Telemark in February 1943.

The film is basically a reconstruction of real events, a docudrama, with many of the participants playing themselves in the film. It was filmed on location in Norway.

Cast

Reception
It was the second most popular film at the French box office in 1948.

See also
The Heroes of Telemark, a 1965 film
The Heavy Water War, a 2015 TV series

References

External links 
 

1948 films
1948 war films
French docudrama films
1940s Norwegian-language films
Norwegian black-and-white films
French World War II films
Films set in Norway
Films shot in Norway
Films about Norwegian resistance movement
Films directed by Jean Dréville
Films directed by Titus Vibe-Müller
Docufiction films
Films about nuclear war and weapons
Science docudramas
Norwegian World War II films
1940s French films